Peter Reid is a football manager and former player.

Peter Reid may also refer to:

Peter Reid (triathlete) (born 1969), Canadian triathlete
Peter Reid (Royal Navy officer) (1903–1973)
Peter Reid (chess player) (1910–1939), Scottish chess player and mountain climber

See also
Peter Reed (disambiguation)
Peter Rede, MP for Dover
 Peter Read (disambiguation)